Silverado Park is a city-operated park of  in the West-Side area of Long Beach,  California.  It was built in the 1930s under the auspices of the Works Progress Administration. 
It is in an area with increased crime rates although events such as a children's Christmas party have also taken place there. 
In 2005 the park was part of a study conducted by CSULB biologists on the behavior of house finches in heavily urbanized environments.

References

External links
 Official website of Silverado Park

Geography of Long Beach, California
Urban public parks